Are We Civilized? is an independently released 1934 pre-Code American social problem film directed by Edwin Carewe which constituted a veiled attack on Adolf Hitler. The film was given a negative review by Time magazine upon its release. Footage of dinosaurs in the film are recycled from the 1918 Willis H. O'Brien's film The Ghost of Slumber Mountain.

Plot 
Paul is a European who served during the Great War, and has since emigrated to the United States. One day he returns to Europe and talks of freedom and liberty. The authorities (clearly based on German Nazis but unnamed) come down on him. It is their duty to spread racism and religious hatred. Paul gives the speech of a lifetime set against an epic series of films spread across the history of mankind.

Cast 
William Farnum as Paul Franklin, Sr.
Anita Louise as Norma Bockner
Frank McGlynn Sr. as Abraham Lincoln, Felix Bockner
LeRoy Mason as Paul Franklin Jr.
Oscar Apfel as Dr. Leonard Gear
Stuart Holmes as Col. Salter
Alin Cavin as Moses
Conrad Seideman as Buddha
Sidney T. Pink as Confucius
Harry Burkhardt as Caesar
Charles Requa as Christ
J.C. Fowler as Mohammed
Bert Lindley as Christopher Columbus
Aaron Edwards as George Washington
William Humphrey as Napoleon

Notes

References
Doherty, Thomas Patrick. Pre-Code Hollywood: Sex, Immorality, and Insurrection in American Cinema 1930-1934. New York: Columbia University Press 1999.

External links 

1934 films
1934 drama films
American black-and-white films
Fictional depictions of Abraham Lincoln in film
American drama films
Films directed by Edwin Carewe
1930s English-language films
1930s American films